Bellot is a surname. Notable people with the surname include:

 Alfred H. Bellot, American historian
 Hugh Hale Bellot, English historian
 Jacob Bellot (born 2000), Petty Officer in the United States Navy
 Jean-Michel Bellot (born 1953), French pole vaulter
 Joseph René Bellot (1826–1853), French arctic explorer
 Paul Bellot (1876–1944), French monk and architect
 Pierre François Bellot (1776–1836), Swiss jurist and politician
 Raymond Bellot (born 1929), French footballer
 Silvia Bellot, Spanish motor racing official
 Thomas Bellot (1806–1857), English naval surgeon and philologist